Hans Thybo (born 19 February 1954) is a Danish geophysicist and geologist. He was a Professor of Geophysics at the Geological Institute and the Institute for Geography and Geology at the University of Copenhagen, as well as at the Centre for Earth Evolution and Dynamics. at University of Oslo. He is a professor at the Eurasia Institute of Earth Sciences at Istanbul Technical University and at the School of Earth Sciences at China University of Geosciences, Wuhan. Until a fusion in 2007 he was elected Head of Department at the Geological Institute and member of the board of Geocenter Copenhagen. He was Professor at Department of Geosciences and Natural Resource Management until he was dismissed from his Chair in 2016. The dismissal was later found illegal and violating employment agreements by an arbitration court and Thybo received a modest economic compensation, but the University of Copenhagen did not re-employ Thybo, nor did the University sanction his accusers. The internationally agreed principle of tenure for university professors does not apply to universities in Denmark. Thybo has earlier been associated with Technische Hogeschool Delft and Stanford University.

Thybo is President of International Lithosphere Program (ILP) og was earlier President for European Geosciences Union, where he also held posts as General Secretary and  President for the Seismology Division. He has been chair for the Danish national committee for ICSU (International Council for Science). He is currently a member of Committee for Freedom and Responsibility in Science of ISC (International Science Council). He is member of and was earlier Vicepresident of Royal Danish Academy of Science and Letters. He has received the 1000 Talents Award from China and he is fellow of Royal Astronomical Society, London and Geological Society of America. He is elected member of Academia Europaea, the Norwegian Academy of Sciences and Letters and Danish Academy of Natural Sciences, and he has been Danish representative to International Council for Science (ICSU).

Hans Thybo has been leader of several geoscientific research programmes and he has been field expedition leader to e.g. the ice sheet in Greenland, east Africa and Siberia. He initiated several pan-European research programmes with east-west collaboration after the end of the cold war. His research includes the discovery of ca. 2 billion year old plate tectonic structures, the fundamental Mid-Lithospheric Discontinuity of the lithospheric mantle, the presence of molten rocks at the Core-Mantle Discontinuity at ca. 3000 km depth below Siberia, a new model for the formation of the economically important sedimentary basins, Presence of strong seismic anisotropy in cratonic crust with the implication that crust and mantle have been coupled for billions of years, and the presence of a hitherto unknown type of crust in Tibet

Early life and education 

In 1978, Thybo earned a Bachelor of Science (BSc) degree in Mathematics and Physics from Aarhus University, Denmark. In 1980, he completed his studies at the Delft University of Technology, the Netherlands. He earned two more degrees from Aarhus University: a Master of Science (MSc) in Geophysics in 1982 and a PhD in Geology in 1987.

Honors

Awards 

 1998: Elected member of the Royal Danish Academy of Sciences and Letters
 2004: Fellow of the Royal Astronomical Society, London
 2004: Elected member of the Academia Europaea
 2010: Elected member of the Norwegian Academy of Sciences and Letters
 2012: Elected member of the Danish Academy of Natural Sciences
 2014: Fellow of the Geological Society of America
 2016: Honorary editor of the scientific journal Tectonophysics
 2018: Thousand Talents Award

Positions 

 2002–2007: President, seismology division of the European Geosciences Union (EGU)
 2004–2008: External member, board of the Faculty of Mathematics and Natural Sciences, University of Oslo
 2006–2017: Danish representative, International Committee of Scientific Unions (ICSU)
 2007–2012: General secretary, European Geosciences Union
 2010–2016: Board, European Plate Observatory System (EPOS)
 2010–present: Board, International Lithosphere Programme (ILP)
 2011–2017: Vice president, Royal Danish Academy of Sciences and Letters
 2013 & 2017: Vice president, European Geosciences Union
 2013–2017: Overseas expert, Chinese Academy of Sciences (CAS)
 2013–present: Nomination committee, Albert Einstein Award of the World Cultural Council
 2014–present: Board, Danish Academy of Natural Sciences
 2014–2016: President, European Geosciences Union
 2015–2017: President-elect, International Lithosphere Program (ILP)
 2017–present: President, International Lithosphere Program
 2017–present: Chair, Inge Lehmann Foundation
 2018–2021: Chair for five panels at the FCT – Portuguese Research Council
 2019–present: Science Advisory Board for Deep-time Digital Earth of IUGS
 2019–present: Member of the Committee for Freedom and Responsibility in Science in the International Science Council

Member of several foreign research council, panels and committees in e.g. USA (NSF), Sweden (VR), International Continental Drilling Program (ICDP), Netherlands, Croatia, France, Canada and China.

References 

Danish geophysicists
Danish geologists
Aarhus University alumni
Members of the Royal Danish Academy of Sciences and Letters
1954 births
Living people
Members of the Norwegian Academy of Science and Letters